Edmund Tompkins DeJarnette (August 22, 1897 – July 13, 1966) was an American politician who was elected to eight terms in the Virginia House of Delegates. In 1955, while serving as majority floor leader of the House, he was defeated in a Democratic primary challenge by Claiborne Gregory.

His son, Edmund DeJarnette Jr., was a career Foreign Service Officer with the United States Department of State.

References

External links 
 
 

1897 births
1966 deaths
Democratic Party members of the Virginia House of Delegates
20th-century American politicians